Clear Creek Reservoir is located in the town of Winslow, Arizona, which is in Navajo County.  It is fed by Clear Creek and drains to the Little Colorado River.

Fish species

 Rainbow trout – stocked once per year by Arizona Game and Fish Department
 Carp
 Sunfish
 Channel Catfish
 Largemouth Bass

External links
 Arizona Fishing Locations Map
 Arizona Boating Locations Facilities Map
 Video of Clear Creek Reservoir

References

 

Reservoirs in Navajo County, Arizona
Reservoirs in Arizona